David J. Argue (born 1959) is an Australian actor. He is best known for his role as Snowy in Gallipoli as well as the lead role in the 1993 film Hercules Returns and Dicko in the 1983 film Razorback.

Filmography

Films

Television
The Restless Years (1977)
Winners (1985)
Raw Silk (1988)
Pirates Island (1991)
Cluedo (1992)
Stark (1993)
Newlyweds (1994) (Two episodes)
Halfway Across the Galaxy and Turn Left (1994)
Correlli (1995) - episode "An Early Release"
The Beast (1996)
Water Rats (1997) - episode "One Dead Rat"
On the Beach (2000)

External links

Australian male film actors
Australian male television actors
Living people
Australian male comedians
1959 births